The San Beda Red Lions basketball program represents San Beda University (SBU) in men's basketball as a member of the National Collegiate Athletic Association (Philippines) (NCAA). The San Beda Red Lions are the only remaining founding team in the NCAA.

History 
Then known as San Beda College (SBC), the Mendiola-based school co-founded the NCAA in 1924, winning its first seniors' basketball title in 1927, then three straight titles from 1934 to 1936. Their three-year title run during the 1930s was led by Charles Borck.

Zamora Cup and 1970s back-to-back titles 
The Zamora Cup was awarded to the first NCAA team that wins three titles after World War II. San Beda led by Carlos Loyzaga emerged as the frontrunner in 1952, winning two titles by then. Ateneo then won the next two titles. In 1955, San Beda and Ateneo made it to the Finals, in which the Red Lions won and kept permanent possession of the trophy. San Beda finished the 1950s with another title in 1959, this time led by Alberto Reynoso.

San Beda would not a win title again until 1977. Coached by Loreto Carbonell and led by Frankie Lim and Chito Loyzaga (Carlos's son), the Red Lions defeated the Ateneo Blue Eagles, with the deciding game being played behind closed doors due to rampant hooliganism at that time. The Red Lions defended their title in 1978, defeating the De La Salle Green Archers. San Beda withdrew from the NCAA in 1984 to focus on intramural events;

Return to the NCAA 
San Beda returned in 1986  The Red Lions made it to the Finals in 1991, only to be thwarted by Benny Cheng's game winner for the Mapua Cardinals. They made another Finals appearance in 1996, this time against the undefeated four-time defending champions San Sebastian Stags but lost. The Red Lions again made it to the Finals in 1997 but were again defeated by the Stags. During this back-to-back Finals appearance, they were coached by Dong Vergiere.

San Beda won't make it to the playoffs again until 2004. On that season, they took the Perpetual Altas to two games in the semifinals before they were eliminated. Nash Racela, who was coaching the Red Lions at this time, was sacked at the middle of the next season and was replaced by Koy Banal.

Dynasty 
In the 21st century, the Red Lions have qualified to 14 consecutive Finals, from 2006 to 2019, where they defeated the PCU Dolphins to end their 28-year title drought.  The next year, they matched the 1977–78 team by winning back-to-back titles defeating the Letran Knights. The Red Lions made it three consecutive titles in 2008, beating the JRU Heavy Bombers. Coached by Frankie Lim starting in 2007, the Red Lions were led by Yousif Aljamal, Ogie Menor and Nigerian import Samuel Ekwe.

The Red Lions were now gunning for a fourth consecutive title, but were stopped by San Sebastian in 2009. The Red Lions won the next two Finals match-ups against the Stags. In the basketball offseason, the Red Lions men's basketball team were involved in a brawl with the San Sebastian women's volleyball team; this led to the NCAA suspending Lim for two years. Lim left the Red Lions and was replaced by Ronnie Magsanoc. With players like Garvo Lanete, Borgie Hermida and American import Sudan Daniel, Magsanoc coached the team to a convincing Finals decider against Letran. Boyet Fernandez replaced Magsanoc in the next season, and won two more titles, in 2013 with a rematch against Letran, and in 2014 against the Arellano Chiefs. This five-year title run matched San Sebastian's domination from 1993 to 1997.

Seeking an unprecedented sixth straight championship in 2015, the Red Lions, now coached by Jamike Jarin, faced Letran anew in the Finals, the Knights won, and stopped San Beda's title run at five. The team would return in the Finals in 2016, against the Chiefs; bannered by Robert Bolick, Javee Mocon and Finals MVP Arnaud Noah of Cameroon, Jarin clinched his first NCAA title against Arellano. Fernandez returned in 2017, and won two consecutive titles against the Lyceum Pirates, being reinforced by the Cameroonian Donald Tankoua.

In their 21st consecutive Finals appearance, the 2020 Red Lions faced the last team that defeated them in the Finals in Letran. The Knights won in the Finals in three games. Due to the COVID pandemic, the NCAA did not hold the basketball events in the 2020 season, and played the 2021 tournament in early 2022. San Beda were upended by the Mapua Cardinals in the elimination round and entered the playoffs without the twice-to-beat advantage. The Cardinals eliminated the San Beda, snapping their Finals streak at 14 years. Management decided not to renew Fernandez's contract, and hired Yuri Escueta to replace him.

Current roster
NCAA Season 98

Head coaches 
 1995–1999: Dong Vergeire
 2004–2005: Nash Racela
 2005–2006: Koy Banal
 2007–2011: Frankie Lim
 2012: Ronnie Magsanoc
 2013–2014: Boyet Fernandez
 2015–2016: Jamike Jarin
 2017–2022: Boyet Fernandez
 2022–present: Yuri Escueta

Season-by-season records

References

Further reading 

 "A Time to Roar: Ending 28 at 82: Reviving the Bedan Animo" by Jude P. Roque 

National Collegiate Athletic Association (Philippines) basketball teams